Limnichoderus is a genus of minute marsh-loving beetles in the family Limnichidae. There are at least 20 described species in Limnichoderus.

Species

References

Further reading

 
 
 
 
 
 
 
 
 
 
 
 
 

Byrrhoidea